Velveting is a technique in Chinese cuisine for preserving the moisture of meat while cooking. Additionally, it provides a soft or "velvety" texture to the meat of any entrée.

The technique is applied to raw meat before cooking either in oil or in water. It involves pre-coating the meat with a mixture of oil, egg white, corn starch, and sherry or rice wine, and then blanching and drying. The meat can then be sautéed, stir-fried, deep-fried, simmered, or boiled. During cooking, the velveting mixture also protects the meat fibres, preventing them from seizing, resulting in more tender meat.

References

Chinese cooking techniques